Tui Ormsby (born 20 January 1978) is a former Australian rugby union player. She represented  and made her international debut in 1997 against the United States at Brisbane.

Ormsby competed in the 1998, 2002, and the 2010 Women's Rugby World Cup where they finished in third place. She became the first Australian player to compete in four Rugby World Cups when she was named in the Wallaroos squad for the 2014 World Cup in France.

References

External links
 
 Player Profile at Classic Wallabies.com.au

1978 births
Living people
Australia women's international rugby union players
Australian female rugby union players
Australian female rugby sevens players
20th-century Australian women
21st-century Australian women